Francis J. "Frank" Beckwith (born November 3, 1960) is an American philosopher, professor, scholar, speaker, writer, and lecturer.

He is currently Professor of Philosophy & Church-State Studies, Affiliate Professor of Political Science and Associate Director of the Graduate Program in Philosophy, at Baylor University, where he first served as Associate Director of Baylor's J. M. Dawson Institute of Church-State Studies.

Beckwith works in the areas of ethics, legal and political philosophy, philosophy of religion, and church-state jurisprudence.

Beckwith is well known for his legal and philosophical work on abortion, arguing in defense of the sanctity of life in several academic publications including his 2007 book Defending Life, published by Cambridge University Press, and his 1993 book, Politically Correct Death, published by Baker Publishing Group. He has also published multiple books examining current philosophical questions regarding religion, law and politics. His 2015 book, Taking Rites Seriously: Law, Politics and the Reasonableness of Faith, (Cambridge University Press), was the winner of the prestigious American Academy of Religion's 2016 Book Award for Excellence in the Study of Religion in the category of Constructive-Reflective Studies.

In May 2007, he returned to the Catholicism of his youth, after decades as an Evangelical Protestant. This inspired him to write a book describing his faith journey, titled Return to Rome: Confessions of an Evangelical Catholic published by Brazos Press. It is compared with Scott Hahn's Rome Sweet Home, as a significant work of Catholic Apologetics.

Life, education and academic appointments  
Beckwith was born in Brooklyn, New York, United States and grew up in Las Vegas, Nevada. He is a graduate of Bishop Gorman High School, where he was a member of the 1978 AAA Basketball high school state championship team. His siblings include the writer, comic, and actress Elizabeth Beckwith.

Francis Beckwith earned a B.A. in philosophy from the University of Nevada, Las Vegas (UNLV). He later earned his MA in apologetics from Simon Greenleaf University, Anaheim, which merged with Trinity International University, Illinois in 1996. Beckwith earned his doctorate from  Fordham University (PhD. and M.A. in philosophy), and his MJS (Master of Juridical Studies) from the Washington University School of Law, St. Louis.

A condensed version of Beckwith's 1984 M.A. thesis on the Baháʼí Faith was published by Bethany House, as Baha'i: A Christian Response in 1985.

In 2001, Beckwith completed his Wash. U. M.J.S dissertation on the inclusion of intelligent design in public school science curricula. In 2003, Rowman and Littlefield published his dissertation in revised and expanded form as Law, Darwinism, and Public Education: The Establishment Clause and the Challenge of Intelligent Design.

Prior to arriving at Baylor in July 2003, he was a Visiting Research Fellow (2002–2003) in the James Madison Program in the Politics Department at Princeton University. He has also held full-time academic appointments at UNLV (Lecturer in Philosophy, 1989–96), Whittier College (Assistant Professor of Philosophy, 1996–97), and Trinity International University (Associate Professor Philosophy, Culture, and Law, 1997-2002). Beckwith has also held two visiting endowed appointments: (2008-2009) Mary Anne Remick Senior Visiting Fellow in the de Nicola Center for Ethics & Culture at the University of Notre Dame, and (2016–2017) Visiting Scholar in Conservative Thought and Policy in the Benson Center for Western Civilization, Thought, and Policy at the University of Colorado, Boulder.

In November 2006, Beckwith became the 58th president of the Evangelical Theological Society (ETS), only to resign both his presidency and membership in May 2007, a week after he returned to the Catholic Church. Over a decade later, he became the 90th president of the American Catholic Philosophical Association (ACPA). From 1995 to 2007, he was a fellow at The Center for Bioethics & Human Dignity (CBHD)

In 2003, after his appointment as associate director of the J. M. Dawson Institute of Church-State Studies at Baylor, 29 members of the Dawson family called on Baylor University to remove Beckwith as associate director. The Dawson family members questioned the appointment, accusing Beckwith of holding church-state positions contrary to Dawson's beliefs on the separation of church and state, largely because of Beckwith's affiliation with the Discovery Institute (DI) and his work on 
intelligent design and public education. Beckwith argued that their concerns were not well founded and that they represented a fundamental misunderstanding of his positions. In summer 2007 Beckwith dropped his affiliation with Discovery. He has subsequently published works highly critical of intelligent design, including chapters in his award-winning 2015 book Taking Rites Seriously''' and his 2019 book Never Doubt Thomas: The Catholic Aquinas as Evangelical and Protestant. 

He currently resides with his wife in Texas.

Bibliography

 Baha'i: A Christian Response to Baha'ism (Bethany House, 1985).
 David Hume's Argument Against Miracles: A Critical Analysis (Lanham: University Press of America, 1989).
 The Mormon Concept of God: A Philosophical Analysis with Stephen E. Parrish (Lewiston, New York: Edwin Mellen Press, 1991). 
 Politically Correct Death: Answering the Arguments for Abortion Rights (Grand Rapids: Baker, 1993). 
 Are You Politically Correct?: Debating America's Cultural Standards with Michael E. Bauman, eds. (Buffalo: Prometheus, 1993). 
 See the gods fall: Four Rivals to Christianity with Stephen E. Parrish, (Joplin: College Press, 1997). 
 Affirmative Action: Social Justice or Reverse Discrimination? with Todd E. Jones, eds. (Amherst: Prometheus, 1997). 
 Relativism: Feet Firmly Planted in Mid-Air with Gregory Koukl, (Grand Rapids: Baker, 1998). 
 The Abortion Controversy 25 Years After Roe v. Wade: A Reader 2nd ed. with Louis Pojman, eds. (Belmont, CA: Wadsworth, 1998). 
 The New Mormon Challenge with Carl Mosser and Paul Owen, eds. (Grand Rapids: Zondervan, 2002). 
 Do the Right Thing: Readings in Applied Ethics and Social Philosophy editor, 2nd ed. (Belmont, CA: Wadsworth, 2002). 
 Law, Darwinism, and Public Education: The Establishment Clause and the Challenge of Intelligent Design (Lanham: Rowman and Littlefield, 2003). 
 To Everyone An Answer: A Case for the Christian Worldview with William Lane Craig and J. P. Moreland, eds. (Downers Grove: InterVarsity Press, 2004). 
 Defending Life: A Moral and Legal Case Against Abortion Choice (New York: Cambridge University Press, 2007) 
 Return to Rome: Confessions of an Evangelical Catholic. Grand Rapids, MI: Brazos Press, 2009 
 Politics for Christians: Statecraft as Soulcraft (Downers Grove: IVP Academic, 2010) 
 A Second Look at First Things: A Case for Conservative Politics. The Hadley Arkes Festschrift (w/ R. P. George, S. McWilliams). (South Bend, IN: St. Augustine Press, 2013) 
 Taking Rites Seriously: Law, Politics, and the Reasonableness of Faith (New York: Cambridge University Press, 2015) 
 Never Doubt Thomas: The Catholic Aquinas as Evangelical and Protestant (Waco, TX: Baylor University Press, 2019)

References

External links
Francis Beckwith Homepage, Francis Beckwith's homepage at Baylor. 
review by Peter Ochs and Randi Rashkover, of Taking Rites Seriously in Journal of the American Academy of Religion, Volume 85, Issue 3, September 2017, Pages 835–838.
review by Dean Stretton of Defending Life in Journal of Medical Ethics 34.11 (Nov 2008): 793–7. 
review by John F Kavanaugh SJ of Defending Life  in America: The Jesuit Review''. November 6, 2007. 

1960 births
Living people
American male non-fiction writers
American theologians
Bishop Gorman High School alumni
Catholics from Nevada
Catholic philosophers
Christian apologists
Converts to Roman Catholicism from Evangelicalism
Critics of Mormonism
Discovery Institute campaigns
Discovery Institute fellows and advisors
Fordham University alumni
Intelligent design advocates
Philosophers of law
Roman Catholic writers
Trinity International University alumni
Trinity International University faculty
University of Nevada, Las Vegas alumni
Washington University School of Law alumni
Whittier College faculty